The Skallagrímur men's football team, commonly known as Skallagrímur, is the men's football department of  Ungmennafélagið Skallagrímur, based in Borgarnes, Iceland.

History
The club first participated in the Icelandic leagues in 1973. The club spent most of its history in the third tier, although they've competed nearly ten times in the second tier. The club was promoted from the second tier for the first and only time in 1996, competing in the 1997 Úrvalsdeild karla, where they finished 9th out of 10 and were relegated. Six years later the club was in the fourth tier and hasn't left it since. After the 2011 season the club announced they wouldn't compete in 2012, but would try to compete again as soon as they could. The club fielded a team again in 2013, starting in the newly established 4. deild karla.

Trophies and achievements

Football
2. deild karla (2):
1983, 1994

References

External links
Team profile at ksi.is

Football clubs in Iceland